The Wendy's 3-Tour Challenge was an unofficial golf event held in November at the Rio Secco Golf Club in Henderson, Nevada. The tournament was a unique stroke play event, and, as the name suggests, pitted three teams, with three members per team, from the PGA Tour, the LPGA Tour, and the Champions Tour (known as the Senior PGA Tour prior to 2001) against each other. The 2013 purse was $1 million.

The challenge event was done in one day, over 18 holes, and is usually held on a Tuesday. It was preceded by an amateur tournament and a one-day pro-am tournament. The event was handicapped to provide all competitors a fair and equal chance of succeeding. The PGA Tour players played the course at its full length, while the Champions Tour players hit from tee positions that made the course shorter and the LPGA players from even shorter tee positions.

The event supported the Dave Thomas Foundation for Adoption, a charity established by the founder of Wendy's, the fast food restaurant that sponsored the tournament. In 2013, the tournament raised a record $4.1 million, and, since it was founded in 1992, it raised more than $50 million overall for the charity.

ABC televised the event until 2009, showing the tournament tape-delayed on a weekend in December just before Christmas, with the first nine holes broadcast on Saturday, and the final nine holes on Sunday. Terry Gannon did the on-air play-by-play. From 2010 to 2013, the event aired on the Golf Channel.

Winners

Summary

See also
Hitachi 3Tours Championship (similar Japanese golf event)

References

External links
Official website
2006 Results

PGA Tour unofficial money events
Former PGA Tour Champions events
Former LPGA Tour events
Team golf tournaments
Golf in Las Vegas
Sports in Henderson, Nevada
Recurring sporting events established in 1992
History of women in Nevada